Manor Road may refer to:

Manor Road, Oxford, England
Manor Road (Phoenix, Maryland), USA
Manor Road railway station, Merseyside, England